Shepherdswell (also Sibertswold) is a village in the civil parish of Shepherdswell with Coldred, and the Dover District of Kent, England.

Culture and community
Village social life centres on the local Grade I listed church 'Church of St Andrew',  and the village hall which is hosts events including charity jumble sales and a pre-school playgroup. The village pub is the Grade II listed Bell by the village green, near to the church. Additionally the village has a Co-op mini-supermarket.

Shepherdswell is significant for the East Kent Railway, whose terminus is sited there. This was originally one of Colonel Stephens's lines and ran to Wingham. The section as far as Eythorne is now run by a preservation society. It has a mainline railway station named Shepherds Well with direct trains to Dover and London via Faversham.

The village is on the Miner's Way Trail. The trail links the coalfield parishes of East Kent. In the village it links with the North Downs Way, which also passes through the village between Whitfield and Woolage Village.

Sport
Shepherdswell is also home the "Shepherdswell Spartans Football Club". Football has been played in the village of Shepherdswell for at least 98 years. Originally the team was called Shepherdswell FC and played from about 1908 until 1965. The name of the next major club in the village was the Whitehall Spartans, who played for most of the 1970s; they became responsible for the name of today's current team. In 1983–84, a team was formed again and named after their then sponsors A1 Taxis which entered the Dover District Sunday League. By the start of the next season their name had reverted to Shepherdswell Spartans as the main team in the village. They took the name Spartans from the local pub, The Whitehall Inn, which was their social base until the pub was shut down in 1989. 

Shepherdswell's cricket team is Shepherdswell C.C. The team plays "friendly" village fixtures from May to September each year against other Kent teams.

Both the football and cricket teams play on  Shepherdswell Recreation Ground.

References

External links

 http://www.british-history.ac.uk/report.aspx?compid=63577
 http://www.kentchurches.info/church.asp?p=Shepherdswell
 http://www.kentarchaeology.org.uk/Research/Libr/VisRec/S/SIB/Gallery.htm

Villages in Kent
Dover District